This is a list of episodes of the British television situation comedy Lead Balloon. The first series of six episodes aired in 2006 and a second series, extended to eight episodes, aired in 2007. The third series began in November 2008. All episodes are written by Jack Dee and Pete Sinclair, and are directed and produced by Alex Hardcastle.

Series 1 (2006)

Series 2 (2007–2008)

Series 3 (2008)
Series 3 is the first series in which the storylines of episodes are connected throughout. The first few storylines are as follows: Michael is distraught about finding out his father's sexuality, Magda is searching for a house after her bedsit gets infested with toxic gas, and Sam and Ben have made a single on YouTube. The following storylines are Magda accidentally selling some of Rick's prized possessions at a car-boot sale, Sam and Ben splitting up and Magda returning home for her sister's wedding.

Series 4 (2011)
The final series of Lead Balloon upholds the continuity throughout that Series 3 maintained. The first main story arc is Rick getting a job as a presenter of a bargain channel. After this arc ends (when Rick is forced to resign after accidentally insulting the viewers on air), another opens up about Rick being taken as a hostage while giving a stand-up comedy lesson in a prison, then getting famous for the story, leading to the climax.

References
Series 1 summaries

External links
List of Lead Balloon episodes at the British Comedy Guide

Lists of British sitcom episodes